Who Made Stevie Crye?, subtitled A Novel of the American South, is a horror novel by American writer  Michael Bishop. It was released in 1984 by Arkham House in an edition of 3,591 copies, and later in paperback
by Headline. It was the author's first novel and third book published by Arkham House.

A 30th Anniversary Edition was published by Fairwood Press in August 2014, including a new introduction by Jack Slay and a new afterword by the author. It also reprints the full-page black and white illustrations by J. K. Potter which were originally commissioned for the Arkham House edition.

Plot summary

The story concerns Mary Stevenson Crye, a newly widowed housewife, who turns to freelance writing to provide for her family. Her typewriter, which is demonically possessed, involves her in a series of occult.

Reception
Dave Langford reviewed Who Made Stevie Crye? for White Dwarf #97, and stated that "Every possible double meaning in the title gets its due airing, and I defy you to predict the outrageous final chapter. Buy this one."

Reviews
Review by Debbie Notkin (1984) in Locus, #286 November 1984
Review by Mary Gentle (1984) in Interzone, #10 Winter 1984/85
Review by Joe Sanders (1984) in Fantasy Review, December 1984
Review by Doc Kennedy (1985) in Rod Serling's The Twilight Zone Magazine, March-April 1985
Review [French] by Élisabeth Campos (1986) in Fiction, #370
Review by Charles L. Grant (1986) in American Fantasy, Fall 1986
Review by Barbara Davies (1988) in Vector 143
Review by Ian Watson (1988) in Horror: 100 Best Books, (1988)

References

Sources

External links
 
 

1984 American novels
1984 fantasy novels
American horror novels
Novels by Michael Bishop (author)